Lan và Điệp (Lan and Điệp) is a form of Vietnamese folk song. It is a cai luong song with a Romeo and Juliet type plot about starcrossed lovers which originated in the 1930s. In the song the girl's name is typically Lan and the boy's name is Điệp. Unlike the typical vong co song which is a solo song of separation from a loved one, the Lan and Diep song is either a duet or a response song.

References

Vietnamese music
Vietnamese songs